Phosphorus mononitride is an inorganic compound with the chemical formula PN. Containing only phosphorus and nitrogen, this material is classified as a binary nitride.

It is the first identified phosphorus compound in the interstellar medium.

It is an important molecule in interstellar medium and the atmospheres of Jupiter and Saturn.

See also
 Triphosphorus pentanitride

References 

Nitrides
Phosphorus compounds
Solids